Ya'akov Margi (born 18 November 1960) is an Israeli politician who currently serves as the Minister of Labor, Social Affairs and Social Services. Margi also serves as a member of the Knesset for Shas.

Biography
Margi was born in Rabat in Morocco and brought to Israel during Operation Yachin in 1962.

Between 1993 and 2003, he served as chairman of the local religious council in Beersheba. Since 2001, he has been the director general of Shas. He was first elected to the Knesset in 2003. After retaining his seat in the 2006 elections, Margi served as group chairperson of the party's faction at the Knesset. He also served briefly as chairman of the House Committee.

He retained his seat again in the 2009 elections, having been placed sixth on the Shas list, and was appointed Minister of Religious Services in the Netanyahu government.

Margi lives in Sde Tzvi, a moshav in Southern Israel. He is married, and a father of two.

During Pope Benedict XVI's visit to Israel, he wrote a letter to the pontiff demanding that he clearly condemn the purveyors of Holocaust denial and antisemitism.

References

External links
 

1960 births
Living people
Deputy Speakers of the Knesset
Government ministers of Israel
Ministers of Religious affairs of Israel
Israeli Orthodox Jews
Israeli people of Moroccan-Jewish descent
Jewish Israeli politicians
Members of the 16th Knesset (2003–2006)
Members of the 17th Knesset (2006–2009)
Members of the 18th Knesset (2009–2013)
Members of the 19th Knesset (2013–2015)
Members of the 20th Knesset (2015–2019)
Members of the 21st Knesset (2019)
Members of the 22nd Knesset (2019–2020)
Members of the 23rd Knesset (2020–2021)
Members of the 24th Knesset (2021–2022)
Members of the 25th Knesset (2022–)
Moroccan emigrants to Israel
20th-century Moroccan Jews
People from Rabat
Shas politicians